Gorilla is a 2019 Indian heist comedy film written and directed by Don Sandy. The film stars Jiiva, Shalini Pandey and Kong, while Yogi Babu, Radha Ravi, Sathish, Rajendran, Vivek Prasanna, Madhan, and Ramdoss appears in pivotal supporting roles. The film also features a real chimpanzee in a prominent role. The music was composed by Sam C. S. with lyrics penned by Yugabharathi, while cinematography was handled by R. B. Gurudev and editing was done by Anthony L. Ruben.

Synopsis 
The film revolves around three down-on-their-luck friends, who have their own problems. Jeeva is a petty criminal, but has fallen in love with Jhansi, who is being pressured to get married. Sathish, who is his family's sole breadwinner, has been given the pink slip at his work, and Venkat is an aspiring actor who hopes he can become a hero if he has money. Into their life walks Sadhik, a farmer who is on the verge of committing suicide after being turned down by the banks. All four hatch a plan to rob a bank, in an inebriated state, and circumstances force them to follow through with what seems to be a ridiculous plan with a chimpanzee as an accomplice.

Cast 

 Jiiva as NS Krishnan
 Shalini Pandey as Jhansi
 Kong as the chimpanzee
 Radha Ravi as Assistant Commissioner Shanmugam
 Sathish as Sathish
 Yogi Babu as Pickpocket
 Rajendran as Barber
 Vivek Prasanna as Venkat
 Madhankumar as Sadiq
 Santhana Bharathi as Minister Ramaiah
 Swaminathan as Bank customer
 Venkat Subha as Chief Minister
 Cinemawala Sathish as Police Inspector
 Vishnu as Ramaiah's son
 Ashritha Sreedas as Jhansi's friend
 Rahul Thatha as Bank security guard
 KPY Sarath as Barber's son
 Boys Rajan as Commissioner

Production 
The production of the film commenced in February 2018 by director Don Sandy who rose to prominence in Kollywood industry with his debut directorial venture Mahabalipuram in 2015. This film also brought the thought of having a gorilla in a key role which was the first ever instance in Indian film history. It was also revealed that the chimpanzee named Kong was hired from the Samut training station of Thailand, which is a world renowned destination for training animals like chimpanzees, gorillas for mainly Hollywood films. The production team also initially roped in RJ Balaji for the film but was later replaced by Sathish. The first look poster of the film was released on 21 June 2018. The teaser of the film was unveiled by actor Suriya on 16 September 2018 through his Twitter account. Most of the sequences related to the chimpanzee were shot in Thailand and the remaining portions were shot in Chennai.

Release
The official trailer 1 of the film was released on 31 May 2019 by Sony Music South.

Soundtrack 
The music of the film was composed by Sam C. S. and lyrics were penned by Yugabharathi, Logan, Aishwarya and Sam C.S. Sony Music India hold the rights of music.

References

External links 

 

2010s Tamil-language films
Indian heist films
Indian comedy thriller films
Films shot in Thailand
Films shot in Chennai
Films about apes
2019 films
Films about primates
Films scored by Sam C. S.